CYSG may refer to:

 Saint-Georges Aerodrome
 Uroporphyrinogen-III C-methyltransferase, an enzyme